Drežnica is a village in the municipality of Bujanovac, Serbia. According to the 2002 census, the village has a population of 86 inhabitants.

Population

References

Populated places in Pčinja District